The following lists events that happened during 1991 in Singapore.

Incumbents
President: Wee Kim Wee
Prime Minister: Goh Chok Tong

Events

January
2 January – New machine-readable passports are issued.
11 January – The National Science and Technology Board is formed to enhance R&D activities in Singapore.
15 January – The five Shared Values of Singapore are adopted.

February
23 February – Civics and moral education is introduced, replacing religious knowledge lessons in schools.

March
2 March – The National Trades Union Congress launches two radio stations, NTUC Heart Radio 91.3 and NTUC Heart Radio 100.3.
16 March – The New Horizon Centre is officially opened, making it the first day care centre to look after those with dementia.
26 March – Four Pakistanis hijack Singapore Airlines Flight 117 and demand the release of Pakistan Peoples Party members from Pakistani jails.
27 March – Members of the Singapore Special Operations Force storm into Singapore Airlines Flight 117, killing all hijackers and freeing all passengers and crew members.

May
4 May – Filipina domestic worker Delia Maga and her 4-year-old charge, Nicholas Huang are found murdered in their flat. Flor Contemplacion was subsequently tried for the murders and found guilty.
13 May – Underwater World opens its doors.
31 May – The Van Kleef Aquarium closes after falling visitorship.

June
1 June – Changi Airport Terminal 2 is officially opened.
3 June – The first National Registration Identity Card (NRIC) replacement exercise takes place in MacPherson Community Club in a programme spanning three years. The programme replaces the existing laminated NRICs to credit-card sized ones with features for higher security. It will also indicate blood types for use in emergencies.
6 June – The Civil Defence Academy starts construction. When completed in 1995, the S$63 million complex spanning nine-hectares will train Singapore Civil Defence Force officers, as well as offer computer simulations.
29 June – IMM opens its doors.

July
1 July -
Nanyang Technological University (NTU) is formed as Singapore's second university, previously known as the Nanyang Technological Institute.
The National Institute of Education (NIE) is formed from the merger of Institute of Education (IE) and the College of Physical Education (CPE). The institution is now part of NTU.

August
1 August – The Singapore International Foundation is formed to help in diplomacy.
2 August – Two areas in Singapore, namely the Central and Changi areas are gazetted as Tree Conservation Areas.
31 August – In the 1991 General Election, the People's Action Party team led by Goh Chok Tong won 77 out of 81 seats (including 41 uncontested seats) with a vote share of 61.0%; then the lowest vote share since surpassed by the 2011 General Election; which had 60.1%. The opposition won the remaining four, in which three seats went to the Singapore Democratic Party and one seat to the Workers' Party.

September
21 September – The second phase of the Central Expressway opens.

October
4 October – The Van Kleef Aquarium reopens as the World of Aquarium.
15 October – The National Arts Council is formed to spearhead the development of the arts in Singapore.
16 October – PolyView is launched to enhance education and IT services. This comes after the release of the IT2000 masterplan a few weeks earlier.

November
24 November – The Keppel-Brani causeway is officially opened, making it the first road link between Singapore and an island.

Births
 28 January – Sufi Rashid - Singaporean singer.
 16 February – Aliff Aziz - Singaporean singer and actor
 15 March – Atikah Suhaime - Singaporean actress.
 21 June – Sachin Mylavarapu, Singaporean cricketer
 26 July – Nathan Hartono, Singaporean singer and runner-up of Sing! China (season 1).
 Jerrold Yam, Singaporean poet and lawyer.

Deaths
 25 January – Ismail Marjan - Badminton player, 70
 17 March – Li Rulin - Chinese literary pioneer (b. 1914).
 17 December – Chen Wen Hsi - Singapore's pioneer artist (b. 1906).

References

 
Singapore
Years in Singapore